Rooibos (meaning "red bush"), or Aspalathus linearis, is a broom-like member of the plant family Fabaceae that grows in South Africa's fynbos biome.

The leaves are used to make a herbal tea that is called  rooibos (especially in Southern Africa), bush tea, red tea, or redbush tea (predominantly in Great Britain).

The tea has been popular in Southern Africa for generations, and since the 2000s has gained popularity internationally.
The tea has an earthy flavour that is similar to yerba mate or tobacco.

Rooibos was formerly classified as Psoralea but is now thought to be part of Aspalathus following Dahlgren (1980).
The specific name of linearis was given by Burman (1759)
for the plant's linear growing structure and needle-like leaves.

Production and processing 

Rooibos is usually grown in the Cederberg, a small mountainous area in the West Coast District of the Western Cape province of South Africa.

Generally, the leaves undergo oxidation. This process produces the distinctive reddish-brown colour of rooibos and enhances the flavour. Unoxidised green rooibos is also produced, but the more demanding production process for green rooibos (similar to the method by which green tea is produced) makes it more expensive than traditional rooibos. It carries a malty and slightly grassy flavour somewhat different from its red counterpart.

Use
Rooibos is commonly prepared as a tisane by steeping in hot water, in the same manner as black tea. The infusion is consumed on its own or flavored by addition of milk, lemon, sugar or honey. It is also served as lattes, cappuccinos or iced tea.

Chemical composition 
As a fresh leaf, rooibos contains a high content of ascorbic acid (vitamin C).

Rooibos tea does not contain caffeine and has low tannin levels compared to black tea or green tea. Rooibos contains polyphenols, including flavanols, flavones, flavanones, dihydrochalcones, aspalathin and nothofagin.

The processed leaves and stems contain benzoic and cinnamic acids.

Grading 

Rooibos grades are largely related to the percentage needle or leaf to stem content in the mix. A higher leaf content results in a darker liquor, richer flavour and less dusty aftertaste. The high-grade rooibos is exported and does not reach local markets, with major consumers being the EU, particularly Germany, where it is used in creating flavoured blends for loose-leaf tea markets.

History 
Three species of the Borboniae group of Aspalathus, namely A. angustifolia, A. cordata and A. crenata, were once used as tea. These plants have simple, rigid, spine-tipped leaves, hence the common name 'stekeltee'. The earliest record of the use of Aspalathus as a source of tea was that of Carl Peter Thunberg, who wrote about the use of A. cordata as tea: "Of the leaves of Borbonia cordata the country people make tea" (Thunberg, July 1772, at Paarl). This anecdote is sometimes erroneously associated with rooibos tea (Aspalathus linearis).

Archaeological records suggest that Aspalathus linearis could have been used thousands of years ago, but that does not imply rooibos tea was made in precolonial times. The traditional method of harvesting and processing rooibos (for making rooibos infusion or decoction tea) could have, at least partly, originated in precolonial times. However, it does not necessarily follow that San and Khoikhoi used that method to prepare a beverage that they consumed for pleasure as tea.

The earliest available ethnobotanical records of rooibos tea originate in the late 19th century. No Khoi or San vernacular names of the species have been recorded. Several authors have assumed that the tea originated from the local inhabitants of the Cederberg. Apparently, rooibos tea is a traditional drink of Khoi-descended people of the Cederberg (and "poor whites"). However, that tradition has not been traced further back than the last quarter of the 19th century.

Traditionally, the local people would climb the mountains and cut the fine needle-like leaves from wild rooibos plants. They then rolled the bunches of leaves into hessian bags and brought them down the steep slopes using donkeys. Rooibos tea was traditionally processed by beating the material on a flat rock with a heavy wooden pole or club or a large wooden hammer.

The historical record of the use of rooibos in precolonial and early colonial times is mostly a record of absence. Colonial-era settlers could have learnt about some properties of the Aspalathus linearis from pastoralists and hunter-gatherers of the Cederberg region. The nature of that knowledge was not documented. Given the available data, the origin of rooibos tea can be viewed in the context of the global expansion of tea trade and the colonial habit of drinking Chinese and later Ceylon tea. In that case, the rooibos infusion or decoction served as a local replacement for the expensive Asian product.

It appears that both the indigenous (San and Khoikhoi) and the colonial inhabitants of rooibos-growing areas contributed to the traditional knowledge of rooibos in some way. For instance, medicinal uses might have been introduced before the 18th century by Khoisan pastoralists or San hunter-gatherers. Also, the use of the Aspalathus linearis to make tea, including the production processes, such as bruising and oxidising the leaves, is more likely to have been introduced in colonial times by settlers who were accustomed to drinking Asian tea or its substitutes.

In 1904, Benjamin Ginsberg ran a variety of experiments at Rondegat Farm and finally cured rooibos. He simulated the traditional Chinese method of making Keemun by fermenting the tea in barrels. The major hurdle in growing rooibos commercially was that farmers could not germinate the rooibos seeds. The seeds were hard to find and impossible to germinate commercially. A medical doctor by profession and business partner to Ginsberg, Pieter Lafras Nortier, ascertained that seeds require a process of scarification before they are planted in acidic, sandy soil.

By the late 1920s, growing demand for the tea had led to problems with supply of the wild rooibos plants. As a remedy, Pieter Lefras Nortier, a district surgeon in Clanwilliam and an avid naturalist, proposed to develop a cultivated variety of rooibos to be raised on appropriately-situated land. Nortier worked on cultivation of the rooibos species in partnership with the farmers Oloff Bergh and William Riordan and with the encouragement of Benjamin Ginsberg.

Bergh harvested a large amount of rooibos in 1925 on his farm Kleinvlei, in the Pakhuis Mountains. Nortier collected seeds in the Pakhuis Mountains (Rocklands) and in a large valley, called Grootkloof, and those first selected seeds are known as the Nortier-type and Redtea-type.

In 1930, Nortier began conducting experiments with the commercial cultivation of the rooibos plant. He cultivated the first plants at Clanwilliam on his farm of Eastside and on the farm of Klein Kliphuis. The tiny seeds were very difficult to come by Nortier, who paid the local villagers £5 per matchbox of seeds collected. An aged Khoi woman found an unusual seed source: having chanced upon ants dragging seed, she followed them back to their nest and, on breaking it open, found a granary.

Nortier's research was ultimately successful, and he subsequently showed all the local farmers how to germinate their own seeds. The secret lay in scarifying the seed pods. Nortier placed a layer of seeds between two mill stones and ground away some of the seed pod wall. Thereafter the seeds were easily propagated. Over the next decade the price of seeds rose to £80 per pound, the most expensive vegetable seed in the world, as farmers rushed to plant rooibos. Today, the seed is gathered by special sifting processes. Nortier is today accepted as the father of the rooibos tea industry.

The variety developed by Nortier has become the mainstay of the rooibos industry enabling it to expand and create income and jobs for inhabitants of rooibos-growing regions. Thanks to Nortier's research, rooibos tea became an iconic national beverage and then a globalised commodity. Production is today the economic mainstay of the Clanwilliam district. In 1948, the University of Stellenbosch awarded Nortier an Honorary Doctorate D.Sc. (Agria) in recognition for his valuable contribution to South African agriculture.

Life history and reproduction 

Aspalathus linearis has a small endemic range in the wild, but horticultural techniques to maximize production have been effective at maintaining cultivation as a semi-wild crop to supply the new demands of the broadening rooibos tea industry. A. linearis is often grouped with the honeybush (Cyclopia), another plant from the Fynbos region of Southern Africa, which is also used to make tea. Like other members of the genus, A. linearis is considered a part of the Fynbos ecoregion in the Cape Floristic Region, whose plants often depend on fire for reproduction.

A. linearis is a legume and thus an angiosperm and produces an indehiscent fruit. Its flowers make up a raceme inflorescence. Seed germination can be slow, but sprouting can be induced by acid treatment. The seeds are hard-shelled and often need scarification.

For A. linearis, fire can stimulate resprouting in the species, but the sprouting is less than that of other plants in the Fynbos ecoregion. A. linearis can be considered facultative and obligate sprouters and have lignotuber development for after fires. Typically, there are two classifications of A. lineraris in response to fire: reseeders and resprouters. Reseeders are killed by fire, but it stimulates their seeds’ germination. Resprouters are not completely killed during a fire and grow back from established lignotubers.

Seeds of wild populations are dispersed by species of ants, whose use as dispersers reduces parent-offspring and sibling-sibling competition.
Ants are also helpful in dispersion as they reduce the susceptibility of seeds to other herbivores.

Like most other legumes, there is a symbiotic relationship between rhizoids and the underground lignotuber structure that promotes nitrogen fixation and growth. The nitrogen content in the soil is an important environmental factor for growth, development, and reproduction. Hawkins, Malgas, & Biénabe (2011) suggested that there are multiple ecotypes of A. linearis that have different selected methods of growth and morphology and are dependent on the environment. It is unclear how many ecotypes there might be, given their limited geographic range and the limited literature about genetic diversity. Van der Bank, Van der Bank, & Van Wyk (1999) suggest that resprouting populations and reseeding populations have been selected for based on the environment as a way to reduce genetic bottlenecks; however, whether that promotes certain reproductive strategies over others was unclear.

Wild populations can contain both sprouting and non-sprouting individuals, but cultivated rooibos are typically reseeders, not resprouters, and have higher growth rates. Cultivated A. linearis can be selected for certain traits that are desirable for human use. Cultivated plants are diploid with a base chromosome number of 9 ( 18 chromosomes), but the understanding of how this might differ in ecotypes is limited. The selection process can include human-mediated pollination, fire suppression, and supplementing soil contents.

Like many other Fynbos plants, A. linearis is not significantly pollinated by cape honey bees, which suggests an alternative way of primary pollination. Some wasps likely play an important role in pollinating the flowers and some wasp species are thought to be specially adapted to accessing the A. linearis flower.

US trademark controversy 
In 1994, Burke International registered the name "Rooibos" with the US Patent and Trademark Office and so established a monopoly on the name in the United States when the plant was virtually unknown there. When it later entered more widespread use, Burke demanded for companies to pay fees to use the name or to cease its use. In 2005, the American Herbal Products Association and a number of import companies succeeded in defeating the trademark through petitions and lawsuits. After losing one of the cases, Burke surrendered the name to the public domain.

Legal protection of the name rooibos 
The South African Department of Trade and Industry issued final rules on 6 September 2013 that protects and restricts the use of the names "rooibos", "red bush", "rooibostee", "rooibos tea", "rooitee", and "rooibosch" in the country so that the name cannot be used for things unless they are derived from the Aspalathus linearis plant. It also provides guidance and restrictions for how products that include rooibos and in what measures should use the name rooibos in their branding.

In May/2021, the European Union conferred protected designation of origin (PDO) status to "rooibos". Any foodstuff sold as "rooibos" in the EU and several countries outside the bloc must be made by using only Aspalathus linearis leaves that are cultivated in the Cederberg region of South Africa.

Environmental concerns
The rooibos plant is endemic to a small part of the Western Cape Province, South Africa. It grows in a symbiotic relationship with local micro-organisms. A 2012 South African news item cited concerns regarding the prospects of rooibos farming in the face of climate change.

The use of rooibos and the expansion of its cultivation are threatening other local species of plants endemic to the area such as Protea convexa and P. scolymocephala.

See also
Cyclopia (plant)
Rooibos wine

References

External links
 

Crotalarieae
Endemic flora of South Africa
Crops originating from South Africa
Flora of the Cape Provinces
Fynbos
Herbal tea
Medicinal plants of Africa
Nitrogen-fixing crops
Afrikaans words and phrases
South African cuisine
Products with protected designation of origin
Taxa named by Nicolaas Laurens Burman